Bonnie Seeman (b. 1969, Huntington, New York) is known for her ceramic work.

Early life and education
She received a BFA in ceramics in 1991 from the University of Miami and an MFA in ceramics in 1996 from the University of Massachusetts Dartmouth.

Career
In 2006, her work was included in the exhibit One of a Kind: The Studio Craft Movement at the Metropolitan Museum of Art in New York City. Her work, Teapot with One Cup, was acquired by the Smithsonian American Art Museum in Washington, D.C. as part of the Renwick Gallery's 50th Anniversary Campaign.

References

Garth Clark and Tony Cunha, The Artful Teapot, New York, Watson-Guptill Publications, 2001, 245

External links
Official website

1969 births
Living people
21st-century American women artists
21st-century ceramists
American ceramists
American potters
American women academics
American women ceramists
University of Miami faculty
Women potters